The list of teams and cyclists in the 2009 Vuelta a España contains the professional road bicycle racers who will compete at the 2009 Vuelta a España from 29 August–20 September 2009.

Teams 
Of the 18 UCI ProTour teams, only  was not invited.  was not invited at first, but they appealed their disinvitation to the Court of Arbitration for Sport and were subsequently granted a place in the race. Each team enters 9 riders, so the race begins with a total of 198.

Start list as at beginning of the race.

Cyclists

References 

2009 Vuelta a España
2009